is a Japanese anime television series based on the Licca-chan fashion doll, which ran on TV Tokyo in 1998–1999. Kodansha also serialized a manga based on the anime series in its monthly manga magazine Nakayoshi. The story follows an ordinary elementary school girl named Licca Kayama and the strange circumstances surrounding her origins, as well as the origins of her protector, Doll Licca.

Plot
After finding out that she is the princess of the Doll Kingdom, third grade student Licca Kayama is in terrible danger. Now, the evil Dr. Scarecrow is after both her and her royal throne, putting her life at risk. Licca's grandmother decides to give her a set of dolls as a gift. When needed, the dolls will transform into larger versions of themselves known as the Doll Knights. Together, they will protect Licca at all costs so she can continue living her normal everyday life.

Characters
: The protector of Licca, is a doll knight who uses a magic yo-yo called "Light Spinner" to fight. She is very noble, and has never hesitated to take risks to protect Licca and her friends.

: is the second doll knight who uses a baton as a weapon called "Light Circle". At start being animated, do not know who is doing it, since according to Nanae only Franz could invoke it, but after a while it is discovered that Catherine was summoning her at the whole time and then by Sumire.

: is the third doll knight who wields a huge sword called "Light Thunder" to fight, with which it is able to shed energy projectiles, and cut his enemies. In the middle of the anime was in the service of evil under orders of Devaul, but then is rescued by Doll Licca and returns to fight on the side of good under the stewardship of Dai.

: the protagonist of the series, is a cheerful and energetic girl. Her mother and grandmother belong to royalty of Culture Fantasy, so she is the princess of the Doll Kingdom but she doesn't know it. When she was just a baby her mother fled there with her and her grandmother, to escape the clutches of the evil Devaul. She has a crush on her neighbor, Rui. She was given by her grandmother a pink bracelet called "Calling Ring" which glows when she's in trouble and Doll Licca comes to the rescue. In later episodes, her "Calling Ring" was upgraded by her grandmother and Licca is able to summon Doll Licca whenever she and her friends are in danger.

: Licca's grandmother, twin sister of Yae, Franz's wife and Orie's mother. She fled with her daughter and granddaughter to the world of humans, carrying a suitcase with the Doll Knights inside. Her pendant is able to wake up Doll Licca, and uses that power to protect Licca throughout the series. She is very kind, always in a good mood and able to do anything for her daughter and granddaughter.

: the twin sister of Nanae, Orie's aunt and Licca's grandaunt, queen of Doll Kingdom, which was possessed by the evil Devaul.

: Mother of Licca, Queen of Doll Kingdom. She turned down her duty as a queen because she was in love with a human, Pierre (future father of Licca). She fled with her mother and daughter to the world of humans to escape Devaul, and always made every effort to protect Licca.

: Licca's best friend, is characterized by her nobility and romance, she spends imagining romantic scenes with Dai since she has a crush on him. During the second half of the series she receives a green bracelet that can invoke Doll Izumi.

: one of Licca's friends, very restless, naughty and aggressive. Always fights with Licca, although she's really in love with Rui and appears whenever he gets very jealous. He receives a blue bracelet to summon Doll Isamu when there is trouble.

: a magician of Doll Kingdom, which is under the command of Devaul. Ordered by Devaul to kidnap Licca, until he reformed on the halfway of the series to defend the princess.

: Licca's father, a musician whose melody is so powerful that it was the final cause of death of Devaul.

: Another friend of Licca, noted for his intelligence and his way of being a bit strange. Most of his hobbies include astronomy, reading books, science and everything related to the study and more than once saved his brilliant ideas to his friends.

: a student who attends college in Ozura and Licca's neighbor. He befriends the family quickly, and Licca is in love with him. He discovers the secret of the Kayama Family after seeing Doll Licca many times and recognize Licca's bracelet. Thanks to him, Dai discovered the whereabouts of the Doll Isamu Calling Ring, and on one occasion he was who encouraged him to rescue Licca.

: Licca's mysterious classmate who appears halfway through the series with Doll Izumi Calling Choker. Helps protect Licca, first anonymously and then discovered, invoking Doll Izumi whenever necessary. On the second halfway of the series it is later revealed that she hides the Doll Izumi Calling Ring in her clothing and Sumire accidentally found it when it fell in her pocket and got captured by Misty in the process to save Licca.

: Licca's grandfather, which was confined to the forest of Al (or Au) to flee the castle. He gave his choker to Catherine to invoke Doll Izumi.

: the main antagonist of the series. A demon who possessed Yae in the forest of Al (Au) and from that moment it was proposed to take full control of Doll Kingdom and later revealed his true form as an enormous dragon. He wants to kidnap Licca. The Doll Knights battled Devaul to protect Licca and her family and friends. With a help from the god Al, Devaul was destroyed forever.

: a creation of Devaul to destroy Licca's squires and to kidnap her. Her powers are far superior to those of any squire, and only three of them can be at your level. She does not totally agree with the thinking of her master, but must obey anyway. After being defeated by the dolls, Devaul absorbed her again.

 and : Scarecrow's assistants, following the orders of their master in all circumstances. In the second half of the series they reformed and protect Licca, using all possible means.

: An evil witch of the Doll Kingdom who enjoys eating children (either boys or girls), that was dormant in a cold region as an old body. She sorts Giize to brings Dai, Tomo and Sumire to her castle, using them as a bait for Licca. After Licca, Sumire, Tomo, Dai, and Catherine arrive in the place, she decides to eat Licca and the other kids instead of give them to Devaul. During the fight against the three Doll Knights, she transforms herself into a giant scorpion, but even so, she was destroyed by them. Devaul sorts Giize awake her to bring Licca for him, so, he gives the souls of children to Dana, and she rejuvenates and goes to her castle in the Doll Kingdom.

Staff
Created by Takara TOMY 
Executive Producer: Tarō Maki (GENCO)
Planning Assistance: Weave
Series Organization: Mami Watanabe, Kazuhiko Sōma
Character Design: Tetsuya Kumagai
Music: Akihiko Hirama, Katsumi Horii
Director: Gisaburō Sugii
Animation Production: Madhouse
A Production of: TV Tokyo, Dentsu, GENCO

Episodes

Theme songs
Ne (opening 1, Rooky)
Ashita no Kimi (opening 2, Tomo Sakurai)
Ne (Cutey Techno Mix) (ending 1, Rooky)
Wow! (ending 2, Rooky)
Love Wars Taisakusen (ending 3, Rooky)
Sono Yume ha Nani Iro (ending 4, Tomo Sakurai)

See also
Licca-chan
YAT Anshin! Uchū Ryokō

References

External links
 
 

1998 anime television series debuts
1998 manga
1999 anime films
Genco
Group TAC
Kodansha manga
Madhouse (company)
Magical girl anime and manga
Shōjo manga
TV Tokyo original programming
Television shows based on Takara Tomy toys